is a Japanese weekly manga magazine published since 1968, by Nihon Bungeisha. The magazine is published every Friday.

Serialized works
Listed alphabetically by title.
69 Denashi (Yasuhito Yamamoto)
Ad Boy (Makoto Niwano)
Aisu Otoko - Iceman (Mio Murao)
Akane Toyori (Shun Sekiguchi)
Angel: the women whom delivery host Kosuke Atami healed (U-Jin)
Angel: the women whom delivery host Kosuke Atami healed season 2 (U-Jin)
Ari Jigoku (Toshiyuki Itakura)
Asakusabito (Masaharu Nabeshima)
Baddoman - Akutarou (Yukio Tamai)
Bakumeshi! (Shigeru Tsuchiyama)
Bonkura (Tsuru Moriyama)
Cement Boy (Shigeru Okamura)
Chloe no Ryuugi (Daisuke Imai)
Dai-46-dai: Natsume Kirou Emon - Kouryuu no Mimi Hatsugenhen (Masaharu Nabeshima, Arimasa Oosawa)
Danjiru Matsuri (Sayumi Sakuragi)
Dark (Keigo Izuki, Seisaku Kanou)
Datsugoku Doctor Inochiya Enma (Jun Tomizawa)
Densha Doori Icchoume (Kunihiko Ikeda)
Dirty (Dai Tennouji)
Dogenzaka Alice (Shigeyuki Iwashita)
Dogesen (Keisuke Itagaki, Rin Kasahara)
Dokaban Shachou (Atsushi Jinbo)
Dokacook  (Yasuhiro Watanabe)
Dororo to Enma-kun (Go Nagai)
Double - Haitoku no Rinjin (Yasuyuki Kunitomo)
Dr. Ashura (Ryou Koshino)
Edomae no Shun (Mori Tsukumo, Terushi Satou)
Fechi no Ana (Masakazu Yamaguchi)
First Lady (Masaru Miyazaki, Yoshihide Fujiwara)
Gannibal (Masaaki Ninomiya)
Gedoubou (Shinji Hiramatsu)
Gedoubou & Murder License Kiba (Shinji Hiramatsu)
Gekiai (Mia Amiya)
Gekiman! (Go Nagai)
Gekiman! - Mazinger Z Hen (Go Nagai)
Gekiman! Cutie Honey Hen (Go Nagai)
Gift ± (Yuka Nagate)
Ginga Legend Weed (Yoshihiro Takahashi)
Ginga Legend Weed: Orion (Yoshihiro Takahashi)
Ginga: The Last Wars (Yoshihiro Takahashi)
Ginga Shōnen Densetsu Dog Days (Yoshihiro Takahashi) (ongoing)
Girls Be... (Hiroyuki Tamakoshi)
Goku!! Otokojuku  (Akira Miyashita)
Gokurakugo (Shinji Hiramatsu, Uni Yasue)
Gokutsuma Keiji (Issaku Wake, Masahito Kagawa)
Gottsuan Desu (Kenji Okamura)
Hadaka no Ringo (Sayaka Yamazaki)
Hakkenshi (Kenji Okamura, Bakin Takazawa)
Hakuryuu (Dai Tennoji, Michio Watanabe)
Hakuryuu Hadou (Dai Tennoji, Michio Watanabe)
Hakuryuu Legend (Dai Tennoji, Michio Watanabe)
Haru no Sakana (Yuuichirou Sueda, Kei Honjou)
Hi no Tori (Fumiyo Kouno)
Higher Ground (Funwari)
Hokori (Yoichi Takahashi)
Honesty (Shou Kitagawa)
Horus no Te (Tatsuya Seki)
Jadou (Shigeru Tsuchiyama)
Jikoman (Yukio Tamai)
Jinnai Ryuujuujutsu Rurouden Majima, Bazeru!! (Makoto Niwano)
Kabuki no Fudou (Subaru Mizuki, Michinori Okitani)
Kaden no Den-san (Atsushi Jinbo)
Kurokan (Norifusa Mita)
Kurokōchi (Richard Woo and Koji Kono) 
Goku!! Otokojuku (Akira Miyashita)
Heisei Harenchi Gakuen (Go Nagai)
Minami no Teiō (Dai Tennōji and Rikiya Gō) (ongoing)
Reverse Edge: Ōkawabata Tanteisha (Garon Tsuchiya and Akio Tanaka) (ongoing)
Shiritsu Kiwamemichi Kōkō 2011 (Akira Miyashita)
Violence Jack (Go Nagai)

References

1968 establishments in Japan
Magazines established in 1968
Magazines published in Tokyo
Nihon Bungeisha
Seinen manga magazines
Weekly manga magazines published in Japan